Malabon (also Clear Lake) is a historical unincorporated community in Lane County, Oregon, United States.  The area is now a scattering of rural houses and farms northwest of Eugene, close to Mahlon Sweet Field.

Clear Lake runs through the area.  It is a widened stretch of Amazon Creek, a tributary of the Long Tom River.

The soils around Malabon define a series of soil types.

The Oregon Historical Society has Southern Pacific Railroad timetables listing Malabon.

References 

Former populated places in Lane County, Oregon
Ghost towns in Oregon